Bettine Jahn (née Gärtz, born 3 August 1958 in Magdeburg) is an East German former athlete. She competed in the women's 100 metres hurdles at the 1980 Summer Olympics.

Biography
She won the 100-meter hurdles at the 1983 World Championship in Helsinki. She set an indoor world record for the 60 meter hurdles in 1983 and won a gold medal at the World Track and Field Championships in Helsinki, Finland. She is still the German record holder for the 100 meter hurdles with 12.42 s.

She married in January 1983 and was initially referred to as Bettine Jahn-Gärtz in the media but later Bettine Jahn.

References

1958 births
Living people
Sportspeople from Magdeburg
People from Bezirk Magdeburg
German female hurdlers
Olympic athletes of East Germany
Athletes (track and field) at the 1980 Summer Olympics
World Athletics Championships athletes for East Germany
World Athletics Championships medalists
Recipients of the Patriotic Order of Merit in gold
World Athletics Championships winners
20th-century German women